Control-K is a computer command. It is generated by pressing the  key while holding down the  key on most computer keyboards.

In hypertext environments that use the control key to control the active program, control-K is often used to add, edit, or modify a hyperlink to a Web page. For example, this key combination is used in Windows versions of Microsoft Word and in many browser-based content management systems.

See also
C0 and C1 control codes
Control-C
Control-D
Control-V
Control-X
Control-Z
Control-\
Keyboard shortcut

References

Computer keys